The 2011–12 BYU Cougars men's basketball team represented Brigham Young University in the 2011–12 college basketball season. This was head coach Dave Rose's seventh season at BYU. The Cougars, in their first season in the West Coast Conference, played their home games at the Marriott Center. They finished the season 26–9, 12–4 in WCC play to finish in third place. They lost in the semifinals of the West Coast Basketball tournament to Gonzaga. They received an at-large bid to the 2012 NCAA tournament where they defeated Iona in the First Four round before falling in the Round of 64 (then called the "Second Round") to Marquette.

Preseason
The Cougars, coming off a 2010–11 season that saw them rise as high as #3 in the AP Poll and ended in the Sweet Sixteen of the NCAA Tournament, had to recover from major personnel losses. Consensus national player of the year Jimmer Fredette and all-time BYU steals leader Jackson Emery, called BYU's "best backcourt ever" by Salt Lake Tribune writer Jay Drew, both graduated. Another frequent starter, freshman swingman Kyle Collinsworth, temporarily left the team to go on a two-year LDS mission.

In addition to the departing players, assistant Dave Rice left to take the head coaching vacancy at UNLV.

The Cougars were picked to finish third in the WCC by the media.

Departures

Recruiting
Gaining size was a key for the 2011 BYU team. In addition to a returning Brandon Davies who would help inside the paint, BYU focused on three centers, two of which are return missionaries who will have their first playing time. The third center, Isaac Nielson, committed to BYU and announced he would serve a church mission before joining the school for the 2013–14 season.

2011–12 return missionaries

2011 media
The school began to hype the basketball season with basketball media days webcasts shown live on BYUtv.org Wednesday, October 12, 2011. Jarom Jordan interviewed all the players, except for Brandon Davies who chose to abstain from interviews until the regular season begins, from the Marriott Center. Common questions asked to the players were how they chose their numbers, what they expected for the upcoming season, what they thought of the new court, and the West Coast Conference. Additionally the Cougars announced that BYUtv would air a True Blue Basketball Preview special on Thursday, November 10, 2011. All Cougar games will be broadcast on the BYU Radio Sports Network with Greg Wrubell serving as the play-by-play man (unless he is away for football) and Mark Durrant providing analysis. When Wrubell is gone for football, Durrant will serve as the play-by-play man with Russ Larson serving as the analyst. Steve Cleveland will also provide analysis on the radio for select conference games. Dave McCann, Blaine Fowler, Steve Cleveland, Robbie Bullough, Jarom Jordan, and Lakia Holmes will provide coverage for BYUtv Sports throughout the season.

The Pre-season WCC poll expects the Cougars to finish 3rd behind Gonzaga and St. Mary's and just ahead of Santa Clara.

BYU Radio Sports Network Affiliates

KSL 102.7 FM and 1160 AM- Flagship Station (Salt Lake City/ Provo, UT and ksl.com)
BYU Radio- Nationwide (Dish Network 980, Sirius XM 143, and byuradio.org)
KTHK- Blackfoot/ Idaho Falls/ Pocatello/ Rexburg, ID
KMGR- Manti, UT
KSUB- Cedar City, UT
KDXU- St. George, UT

Roster

High school prospects

2011–12 underclassmen verbal commitments

Schedule and results
Source

|-
!colspan=9 style="background:#002654; color:#FFFFFF;"| Exhibition

|-
!colspan=9 style="background:#002654; color:#FFFFFF;"| Regular season

|-
!colspan=12 style="background:#FFFFFF;; color:#002654"|  2012 West Coast Conference men's basketball tournament

|-
!colspan=12 style="background:#FFFFFF;; color:#002654"| 2012 NCAA tournament

On March 13, 2012, BYU set a record for the largest comeback in an NCAA tournament game, as they were down by 25 points at one point in their first match of the 2012 NCAA Division I men's basketball tournament and came back to beat the Iona Gaels 78–72.

Game summaries

Cougar tipoff
Broadcasters: Jarom Jordan and Steve Cleveland

Exhibition: Midwestern State
Broadcasters: Dave McCann, Steve Cleveland, and Robbie Bullough

Exhibition: Dixie State
Broadcasters: Dave McCann, Steve Cleveland, and Robbie Bullough

at Utah State
BYU leads series 136-91Broadcasters: Mychal Clanton and Brooks Hansen

BYU-Hawaii
First series meetingBroadcasters: Jarom Jordan and Steve Cleveland

Longwood
First series meetingBroadcasters: Dave McCann and Steve Cleveland

Prairie View A&M
First series meetingBroadcasters: Dave McCann, Blaine Fowler, and Robbie Bullough

vs. Nevada
BYU leads series 12-6Broadcasters: Dave McCann and Steve Cleveland

vs. Wisconsin
Wisconsin leads series 1-0Broadcasters: Brian Anderson and Eddie Johnson

vs. Northern Arizona
Northern Arizona leads series 1-0Broadcasters: Dave McCann and Steve Cleveland

vs. Oregon
Oregon leads series 12-8Broadcasters: Roxy Bernstein and Miles Simon

Weber State
BYU leads series 26-10Broadcasters: Dave McCann, Blaine Fowler, and Lakia Holmes

at Utah
BYU leads series 127-125Broadcasters: Barry Tompkins and Reggie Theus

Baylor
BYU leads series 5-2Broadcasters: Dave McCann, Blaine Fowler, and Robbie Bullough (Steve Cleveland Halftime and Postgame)

Buffalo
BYU leads series 1-0Broadcasters: Dave McCann, Blaine Fowler, and Robbie Bullough

UC Santa Barbara
First series meetingBroadcasters: Dave McCann, Blaine Fowler, and Robbie Bullough

Cal State- San Marcos
First series meetingBroadcasters: Dave McCann, Steve Cleveland, and Robbie Bullough

at Saint Mary's
BYU leads series 8-2Broadcasters: Dave Flemming and Sean Farnham

San Diego
BYU leads series 2-0Broadcasters: Jarom Jordan, Blaine Fowler, and Robbie Bullough

at Loyola Marymount
Loyola Marymount leads series 2-1Broadcasters: Dave McCann and Blaine Fowler

San Francisco
Series tied 5-5Broadcasters: Dave McCann, Blaine Fowler, and Robbie Bullough (Steve Cleveland Halftime and Postgame Show)

Santa Clara
BYU leads series 15-5Broadcasters: Dave Flemming and Sean Farnham

at San Diego
BYU leads series 3-0Broadcasters: Steve Quis and Jim Brogan (Blaine Fowler and Steve Cleveland Halftime)

Loyola Marymount
Series even 2-2Broadcasters: Dave McCann, Blaine Fowler, and Robbie Bullough

at Pepperdine
Series even 4-4Broadcasters: Dave McCann and Steve Cleveland (Jamie Zaninovich Halftime)

at Virginia Tech
BYU leads series 1-0Broadcasters: Walter Storhlot and Steven Binder

Saint Mary's
BYU leads series 8-3Broadcasters: Dave Flemming and Sean Farnham (Jarom Jordan, Steve Cleveland, and Robbie Bullough Postgame)

Gonzaga
Series even 1-1Broadcasters: Dave Flemming and Sean Farnham (Blaine Fowler, Steve Cleveland, and Robbie Bullough Postgame)

at Portland
BYU leads series 4-1Broadcasters: Dave McCann and Steve Cleveland

Pepperdine
BYU leads series 5-4Broadcasters: Dave McCann, Steve Cleveland, and Robbie Bullough

at San Francisco
BYU leads series 6-5Broadcasters: Mark Neely and Miles Simon

at Santa Clara
BYU leads series 16-5Broadcasters: Mark Neely and Miles Simon

at Gonzaga
BYU leads series 2-1Broadcasters: Brent Musburger and Sean Farnham

Portland
BYU leads series 5-1Broadcasters: Dave McCann, Steve Cleveland, and Robbie Bullough

WCC Tournament: vs. San Diego
BYU leads series 4-0Broadcasters: Dave Flemming and Sean Farnham

WCC Tournament: vs. Gonzaga
Series even 2-2Broadcasters: Dave Flemming and Sean Farnham

NCAA Tournament First Four: vs. Iona
First series meetingBroadcasters: Jim Nantz, Clark Kellogg, Steve Kerr, and Tracy Wolfson

NCAA Tournament 2nd Round: vs. Marquette
Series even 2-2Broadcasters: Verne Lundquist, Bill Raftery, and Lesley Visser

Rankings

*AP does not release post-NCAA Tournament rankings.

References

BYU Cougars men's basketball seasons
BYU
BYU
BYU Cougars men's basketball
BYU Cougars men's basketball